A Guided track system may refer to:
 Maglev
 Rail tracks
 Tramway tracks